Matt Mattox (born February 9, 1982) is an American football coach, who is the current offensive line coach of the Purdue Boilermakers.

Prior to taking the job with the South Florida, Mattox was the co-offensive coordinator and offensive line coach at the University of Tulsa, Bowling Green State University, and the University of Texas.

In 2015, Mattox joined the staff at the University of Texas as offensive line coach and run game coordinator.

On December 30, 2016 247 Sports reported that Mattox had taken the offensive line coach and run game coordinator position at South Florida, the same position he held under new South Florida head coach Charlie Strong at Texas.

In 2018, Mattox became offensive coordinator/offensive line coach for McNeese State joining Gilbert, who was hired as head coach.

On December 11, 2019, Mattox joined the UTSA coaching staff as the run game coordinator and offensive line coach for the 2020 football season with new head coach Jeff Traylor.

Personal life
Mattox was born in Topeka, Kansas, and graduated from Holton High School in Holton, Kansas in 2000. He attended and played football for Butler Community College for two years before transferring to University of Houston where he finished out his eligibility and graduated in 2005.  His wife Stacey also attended the University of Houston.  They have been married since 2010 and have two children together, Kirby and Macey.

References

1982 births
Living people
American football tight ends
American football offensive tackles
Bowling Green Falcons football coaches
Butler Grizzlies football players
Eastern Illinois Panthers football coaches
Houston Cougars football coaches
Houston Cougars football players
South Florida Bulls football coaches
Texas Longhorns football coaches
Tulsa Golden Hurricane football coaches
Butler Grizzlies football coaches
People from Holton, Kansas
Sportspeople from Topeka, Kansas
Players of American football from Kansas
Coffeyville Red Ravens football coaches
UTSA Roadrunners football coaches
Purdue Boilermakers football coaches